Pomona Township is one of sixteen townships in Jackson County, Illinois, USA.  As of the 2010 census, its population was 802 and it contained 372 housing units.

Geography

Unincorporated towns
 Etherton at 
 Pomona at 
(This list is based on USGS data and may include former settlements.)

Extinct towns
 Eltham at 
(These towns are listed as "historical" by the USGS.)

Adjacent townships
 Murphysboro Township (north)
 Carbondale Township (northeast)
 Makanda Township (east)
 Grand Tower Township (west)
 Sand Ridge Township (northwest)

Cemeteries
The township contains these five cemeteries: Dutch Ridge, Etherton, Hagler, Mount Pleasant and Stearns.

Demographics

School districts
 Cobden School Unit District 17
 Murphysboro Community Unit School District 186

Political districts
 Illinois' 12th congressional district
 State House District 115
 State Senate District 58

References
 
 United States Census Bureau 2007 TIGER/Line Shapefiles
 United States National Atlas

External links
 City-Data.com
 Illinois State Archives

Townships in Jackson County, Illinois
Townships in Illinois